"Too Many Times" is a song by Australian rock band Mental As Anything, released in September 1981 as the second single from their third studio album, Cats & Dogs. The song peaked at number 6 on the Kent Music Report.

Track listing

Personnel 
 Martin Plaza — lead vocals, guitar    
 Greedy Smith — lead vocals, keyboards, harmonica
 Reg Mombassa — guitar, vocals  
 Peter O'Doherty — bass, guitar, vocals 
 Wayne de Lisle – drums

Charts

Weekly charts

Year-end charts

References 

Mental As Anything songs
1981 songs
1981 singles
Regular Records singles
A&M Records singles
Songs written by Greedy Smith